Hemlock Falls is a waterfall located in Rabun County, Georgia.  It is located in the Tallulah Ranger District of the Chattahoochee National Forest on Moccasin Creek.  The Hemlock Trail is about one mile long, beginning at Moccasin Creek State Park and following an old railroad bed.

External links
Hemlock Trail profile on GeorgiaTrails.com
U.S. Forest Service Website for Hemlock Falls and Hemlock Trail

Waterfalls of Georgia (U.S. state)
Protected areas of Rabun County, Georgia
Chattahoochee-Oconee National Forest
Waterfalls of Rabun County, Georgia